Warthi is a large village in the Mohadi Taluka in the Bhandara district of the Indian state of Maharashtra. Warthi is known for its steel industries.

Transport 
It is situated on newly declared  National Highway NH 543K which connects cities of Bhandara and Balaghat in Maharashtra and Madhya Pradesh respectively. It hosts the Bhandara Road Railway Station.

Education 
The Government College of Education is a school in Warthi. A private school is run by the iron and steel industry, for children of employees and local people. This school is affiliated with the Central Board of Secondary Education.

Demographics
Warthi has a population of 13,058. Out of this total 6,629 are males and 6,429 are females.

The population of children between the age of 0-6 is 1,443. This is 11.05 % of the total population. The literacy rate is 90.75%, higher than the state average of 82.34%. In Warthi, male literacy is approximately 94.91% while female literacy is 86.49 %.

The villagers speak the Marathi Language.

Religion
Hinduism is the predominant religion in Warthi, followed by Buddhism and Islam.

References

Cities and towns in Bhandara district